Local elections were held in Graz on 20 January 2008. Apart from the five parties present in the municipal council – the Austrian People's Party, the Social Democratic Party of Austria, the Communist Party of Austria, the Freedom Party of Austria and the Greens – The Green Alternative – the Alliance for the Future of Austria also contested the election.

A poll from early December 2007 saw the lead of incumbent mayor Siegfried Nagl (ÖVP) diminish:
 ÖVP: 32% (2003: 36.1%)
 SPÖ: 28% (2003: 25.9%)
 KPÖ: 15% (2003: 20.8%)
 Grüne: 14% (2003: 8.3%)
 FPÖ: 8% (2003: 8%)
 BZÖ: 2% (2003: n/a)

|-
! style="background-color:#E9E9E9;text-align:left;vertical-align:top;" |Party
! style="background-color:#E9E9E9;text-align:right;" |Votes
! style="background-color:#E9E9E9;text-align:right;" |%
! style="background-color:#E9E9E9;text-align:right;" |Seats
! style="background-color:#E9E9E9;text-align:right;" |+/–
! style="background-color:#E9E9E9;text-align:right;" |Councillors
! style="background-color:#E9E9E9;text-align:right;" |+/–
|-
| style="text-align:left;" |Austrian People's Party (ÖVP)
| style="text-align:right;" |43,274
| style="text-align:right;" |38.37
| style="text-align:right;" |23
| style="text-align:right;" |+2
| style="text-align:right;" |4
| style="text-align:right;" |±0
|-
| style="text-align:left;" |Social Democratic Party of Austria (SPÖ)
| style="text-align:right;" |22,266
| style="text-align:right;" |19.74
| style="text-align:right;" |11
| style="text-align:right;" |–4
| style="text-align:right;" |2
| style="text-align:right;" |–1
|-
| style="text-align:left;" |The Greens – The Green Alternative (Grüne)
| style="text-align:right;" |16,416
| style="text-align:right;" |14.56
| style="text-align:right;" |8
| style="text-align:right;" |+4
| style="text-align:right;" |1
| style="text-align:right;" |+1
|-
| style="text-align:left;" |Communist Party of Austria (KPÖ)
| style="text-align:right;" |12,611
| style="text-align:right;" |11.18
| style="text-align:right;" |6
| style="text-align:right;" |–6
| style="text-align:right;" |1
| style="text-align:right;" |–1
|-
| style="text-align:left;" |Freedom Party of Austria (FPÖ)
| style="text-align:right;" |12,235
| style="text-align:right;" |10.85
| style="text-align:right;" |6
| style="text-align:right;" |+2
| style="text-align:right;" |1
| style="text-align:right;" |+1
|-
| style="text-align:left;" |Alliance for the Future of Austria (BZÖ)
| style="text-align:right;" |4,857
| style="text-align:right;" |4.31
| style="text-align:right;" |2
| style="text-align:right;" |+2
| style="text-align:right;" |—
| style="text-align:right;" |—
|-
| style="text-align:left;" |Austrian Drivers' and Citizens' Party (ÖABP)
| style="text-align:right;" |556
| style="text-align:right;" |0.49
| style="text-align:right;" |—
| style="text-align:right;" |—
| style="text-align:right;" |—
| style="text-align:right;" |—
|-
| style="text-align:left;" |Wegscheidler's List (WEG)
| style="text-align:right;" |231
| style="text-align:right;" |0.20
| style="text-align:right;" |—
| style="text-align:right;" |—
| style="text-align:right;" |—
| style="text-align:right;" |—
|-
| style="text-align:left;" |Peter Pailer's List (SALZ)
| style="text-align:right;" |218
| style="text-align:right;" |0.19
| style="text-align:right;" |—
| style="text-align:right;" |—
| style="text-align:right;" |—
| style="text-align:right;" |—
|-
| style="text-align:left;" |Centre Party Austria (ZPA)
| style="text-align:right;" |111
| style="text-align:right;" |0.10
| style="text-align:right;" |—
| style="text-align:right;" |—
| style="text-align:right;" |—
| style="text-align:right;" |—
|-
|style="text-align:left;background-color:#E9E9E9"|Total (turnout 57.90%)
|width="75" style="text-align:right;background-color:#E9E9E9"|114,654
|width="30" style="text-align:right;background-color:#E9E9E9"|100.00
|width="30" style="text-align:right;background-color:#E9E9E9"|56
|width="30" style="text-align:right;background-color:#E9E9E9"|—
|width="30" style="text-align:right;background-color:#E9E9E9"|9
|width="30" style="text-align:right;background-color:#E9E9E9"|—
|-
| colspan=7|Source: 
|}

References

2008 elections in Austria
Local elections in Austria
January 2008 events in Europe